Fresh Expressions is an international, cross-denominational, creative movement of Christians working alongside existing congregations to cultivate new forms of church for those who have never been involved in church or who have left the church. The purpose of Fresh Expressions isn't to get people to attend a traditional or typical form of church on Sunday mornings. The purpose of Fresh Expressions is to connect with people, especially those who would never enter a church building, to form new faith communities in places where people are already gathering in contemporary culture. "Fresh Expressions are places where the people of God communicate the love of God in new and compelling ways.""[A] Fresh Expression is a form of church for our changing culture established primarily for the benefit of people who are not yet members of any church" – FX Denominational Partners, 2006

History
The Fresh Expressions movement officially started in the United Kingdom in 2004 after a report from the Church of England shared ways in which churches and Christian faith communities had been creatively and intentionally responding to a rapidly post-Christian society since the 1990s. The 2004 Mission Shaped Church Report, a report of the General Synod of the Church of England and instigated by Archbishop Rowan Williams, revealed that, despite the statistical decline in church attendance and the rapidly changing culture in the UK, "fresh expressions" of church were emerging and thriving across the area. The report also shared encouragement and recommendations for the future practice of the pioneering and creative movement of doing 'church' differently.

From this the Fresh Expressions initiative was born, beginning as a partnership between the Church of England and the Methodist Church with the leadership of Bishop Steven Croft and Reverend Peter Pillinger. The partnership has since expanded to include a number of other church traditions and organizations in the UK and beyond, including the Church of Scotland, the United Reformed Church, the United Methodist Church, and the Baptist Union. Today, Fresh Expressions works with denominations, regional church bodies, individual congregations and ministry leaders to provide vision and actionable training. The movement has birthed thousands of new faith communities and has taken root in Australia, Austria, Canada, Germany, Netherlands, Norway, South Africa, Sweden, Switzerland and the United States of America."Nothing else, as a whole in the Church of England has this level of missional impact and the adding of further ecclesial communities, thereby feeling ecclesial re-imagination." - George Lings, 'Day of Small Things'

Fresh Expression values 
While Fresh Expressions can take several different forms, several key features unite fresh expressions, providing clarity around what makes something a Fresh Expression. Fresh expressions are missional, contextual, ecclesial, and formational.

A Fresh Expression is missional 
Each fresh expression is aimed to reach those who don't go to church. Fresh expressions are not meant to be Bible studies for church people in unique places. Fresh expressions are to be uniquely and intentionally designed to create new forms of church in society with those who do not attend church.

A Fresh Expression is contextual 
Each fresh expression is grounded in the language and culture of the particular community it is trying to reach and its context. Based on its context, the fresh expression seeks to find culturally appropriate and effect ways of reaching people to share about Jesus. The mutual interests of those the fresh expression is connecting with creates the bond for these groups. Fresh expressions can be rural, suburban, or urban. They can be in public spaces, housing projects, or college dormitories. Some are aimed at specific groups, like bikers, artists, or those suffering homelessness.

A Fresh Expression is ecclesial 
Each fresh expression intends to become church for the people it reaches in its context. Fresh expressions are not to operate as ministries of a specific church - the are to operate as a church, as an expression of church. While fresh expressions do not seek to get people inside typical and traditional churches, fresh expressions still seek to make disciples.

A Fresh Expression is formational 
Fresh expressions seek to form disciples of Christ. Like traditional expressions of church, fresh expressions seeks to develop disciples. How discipleship is lived out will vary based on the context and community of each fresh expression.

Criticism

Canon Dr. John Dunnill of St George's Cathedral, Perth says that a Fresh Expressions project can sometimes be more about form than substance.  Alison Milbank has argued that aiming to be independent congregations in this way undermines existing authority structures within the parish system. Andrew Davison and Milbank further criticised Fresh Expressions from a broadly Anglo-Catholic perspective for separating themselves from geographical parishes, holding to a weak ecclesiology, abandoning liturgical services, and promoting 'choice-led individualism' over Anglican traditions.

There is some debate as to how to measure success for a fresh expression. The three (or four) selfs offer a useful lens by which to measure governance, finance, and reproducibility, but say little about the underlying health of the mission or discipleship of the church. Michael Moynagh recommends the four 'f's of fruit (is the community deepening in their faith?), flow (are members who move on being helped into another form of Christian community?), family (is the church connected to denominational or group networks?), and freedom (does the church have appropriate levels of independence in decision making?). Andrew Dunlop prefers a more theological approach to success, taking account of the action of God in the life of the church community and in the lives of individuals.

References

External links
 Fresh Expressions UK official website
 Fresh Expressions Canada official website
 Fresh Expressions US official website
 Church Times article

Methodism
Church of England societies and organisations
Anglicanism
Christian missionary societies
Missional Christianity
Emerging church movement
United Methodist Church